We've Been Had Again is an album by the American alternative rock band Huffamoose, released in 1997. The songs "Wait" and "James" were minor modern rock hits. The band supported the album by touring for a time with the 1998 H.O.R.D.E. Festival.

Production
The band spent two years recording the album, while often disagreeing with its producers and label about the musical direction of the tracks. The album's original producer quit due to frustration over the band's fondness for jazz chords. The band finished We've Been Had Again at a studio in Ardmore, Pennsylvania, with the producer who had worked on its demo.

Critical reception
The Hartford Courant wrote that "drummer Erik Johnson and guitarist Kevin Hanson, in particular, are inventive instrumentalists, and singer Craig Elkins breathes a measured soul into songs of postmodern angst." The Spokesman-Review deemed the album "so rich with guitar swaths and Jeff Buckley-like vocal dynamics, it takes more than one listen to truly plumb its depths." 

The Wisconsin State Journal thought that the album "never sticks to a single style, tone, mood or perspective, and the results are unpredictable and satisfying." The St. Petersburg Times opined that Huffamoose's "dark, hip musical spirit invokes the style and imagery of Steely Dan."

Track list

References

1997 albums
Huffamoose albums
Interscope Records albums